is a railway station in the city of Tsubame, Niigata, Japan, operated by East Japan Railway Company (JR East).

Lines

Station layout
The station consists of one ground-level side platform serving a single bi-directional track.

The station is unattended. Suica farecard cannot be used at this station.

History 
The station opened on 10 June 1965. With the privatization of Japanese National Railways (JNR) on 1 April 1987, the station came under the control of JR East. A new station building was completed March 2000.

Surrounding area
 
 Tsubame City Hall

See also
 List of railway stations in Japan

References

External links

 Minami-Yoshida Station information 

Railway stations in Niigata Prefecture
Stations of East Japan Railway Company
Railway stations in Japan opened in 1965
Echigo Line
Tsubame, Niigata